Acoustic Guitar was Preston Reed's first release on Sky Records. It subsequently went out-of-print.

Track listing
All songs composed and arranged by Preston Reed.
 "Kristy" – 3:46
 "Bush Street Beehive" – 6:58
 "Elephant Walk" – 1:57
 "White Man's Burden" – 3:21
 "Working Alone" – 4:09
 "Bye Bye Boo Boo" – 5:32
 "Song for Jesse" – 2:51
 "It's Not Just Your Face" – 4:09
 "Song I've Heard Before" – 2:19
 "Barbara" – 5:34

Personnel
 Preston Reed – 6 & 12-string acoustic guitars
 Jeff Pevar – second guitar on "It's Not Just Your Face"

Production notes
 Engineered by Jonathan Freed
 Cover Design by Karen Burgess
 Photography by Jamie Gosnell

References

Preston Reed albums
1979 debut albums